Sisters of the Immaculate Conception may refer to:
 Sisters of Providence of the Immaculate Conception, see appropriate section in Congregation of the Immaculate Conception
 Sisters of the Immaculate Conception (France), see appropriate section in Congregation of the Immaculate Conception
 Sisters of the Immaculate Conception (Louisiana), see appropriate section in Congregation of the Immaculate Conception
 Sisters of the Immaculate Conception (originally Spain), see appropriate section in Congregation of the Immaculate Conception
 Sisters of the Immaculate Conception of the Blessed Virgin Mary, founded in Lithuania
 Armenian Sisters of the Immaculate Conception
 For information on the Congregation of the Sisters of the Immaculate Conception of the Blessed Virgin Mary in Poland, Belarus, and Ukraine, see Marcelina Darowska, who was the founder.